The canton of Lezoux is an administrative division of the Puy-de-Dôme department, central France. Its borders were modified at the French canton reorganisation which came into effect in March 2015. Its seat is in Lezoux.

It consists of the following communes:
 
Bort-l'Étang
Bulhon
Crevant-Laveine
Culhat
Joze
Lempty
Lezoux
Moissat
Orléat
Peschadoires
Ravel
Saint-Jean-d'Heurs
Seychalles
Vinzelles

References

Cantons of Puy-de-Dôme